Áed Dub mac Colmáin or Áed(h) of Kildare is a former King of Leinster, and an Irish saint, commemorated by Colgan under date of 4 January; but much obscurity attaches to his life-work. The Annals of the Four Masters and the Annals of Ulster agree in the account of this monarch, who resigned his crown and eventually became Bishop of Kildare. Under the name of Aidus, a Latinized form of Áed, his name is to be found in several martyrologies. The year of his death was 639, according to the corrected chronology of the "Annals of Ulster."

Colgan tells us that he resigned the throne of Leinster in 591 (really, 592), and entered the great monastery of Kildare, where he served God for forty-eight years, becoming successively abbot of Kildare and bishop of Kildare. His episcopate was from about 630 to 639.

He should not be confounded with Áed Finn, king of Ossory, known as "Áed the cleric," who was a contemporary, and resigned the throne of Ossory for a monastic cell. St. Áed of Leinster is styled Áed Dub, from his dark features, whilst Áed of Ossory was fair, hence the affix finn (fionn = fair). Another St. Áed is venerated on 3 May.

References

639 deaths
People from County Kildare
7th-century Christian saints
Medieval saints of Leinster
6th-century Irish monarchs
7th-century Irish abbots
7th-century Irish bishops
Year of birth unknown
Bishops of Kildare